The 2021 FIBA Under-19 Women's Basketball World Cup was a tournament organised by FIBA for women's youth national teams aged 19 years old and below. The tournament was hosted in Debrecen, Hungary from 7 to 15 August 2021.

The United States won their ninth title by defeating Australia in the final. Hungary won their first ever medals after a win over Mali.

Qualified teams

Draw
The draw took place on 28 April 2021 in Berlin, Germany.

Seeding
On 27 April 2021, the pots were announced.

Preliminary round
All times are local (UTC+2).

Group A

Group B

Group C

Group D

Knockout stage

Bracket

5–8th place bracket

9–16th place bracket

13–16th place bracket

Round of 16

9–16th place quarterfinals

Quarterfinals

13–16th place semifinals

9–12th place semifinals

5–8th place semifinals

Semifinals

15th place game

13th place game

Eleventh place game

Ninth place game

Seventh place game

Fifth place game

Third place game

Final

Final standings

Statistics and awards

Statistical leaders

Players

Points

Rebounds

Assists

Blocks

Steals

Efficiency

Team

Points

Rebounds

Assists

Blocks

Steals

Efficiency

Awards
The awards were announced on 15 August 2021.

References

External links
Official website
Tournament summary

2021
FIBA Under-19 World Championship
FIBA
Basketball
Sport in Debrecen
FIBA
FIBA